This is a list of all (former) Member of the European Parliament for the People's Party for Freedom and Democracy (VVD) 
Source:

Seats in the European Parliament

Alphabetical

Delegation members of the European Coal and Steel Community Parliament (from 1952-58)

Delegation members of the European Parliament (1958-79)

Elected members of the European Parliament (from 1979)
Current members of the European Parliament are in bold.

European Parliament periods

1952–1958 

 Henk Korthals

1958–1979 

 Jan Baas
 Cees Berkhouwer
 Frederik Gerard van Dijk
 Henk Korthals
 Jo Schouwenaar-Franssen
 Bob de Wilde

1979-1984 

4 seats:
 Cees Berkhouwer (fractievoorzitter)
 Aart Geurtsen
 Hendrik Jan Louwes
 Hans Nord

1984-1989 

5 seats:
 Jessica Larive
 Hendrik Jan Louwes
 Hans Nord (fractievoorzitter)
 Gijs de Vries
 Florus Wijsenbeek

1989-1994 

3 seats:
 Jessica Larive
 Gijs de Vries (fractievoorzitter)
 Florus Wijsenbeek

1994-1999 

6 seats:
 Jessica Larive
 Jan Mulder
 Elly Plooij-van Gorsel
 Gijs de Vries (fractievoorzitter till 2 Augustus 1998) (replaced by: Robert Jan Goedbloed)
 Jan-Kees Wiebenga (fractievoorzitter from 2 Augustus 1998)
 Florus Wijsenbeek
 Robert Jan Goedbloed

1999-2004 

6 seats:
 Jules Maaten (fractievoorzitter from October 2001)
 Toine Manders
 Jan Mulder
 Elly Plooij-van Gorsel
 Marieke Sanders-Ten Holte
 Jan-Kees Wiebenga (fractievoorzitter till October 2001)
 Herman Vermeer (from 12 November 2001)

2004-2009 

4 seats:
 Jeanine Hennis-Plasschaert
 Jules Maaten (fractievoorzitter)
 Toine Manders
 Jan Mulder

2009-2014 

3 seats:
 Jeanine Hennis-Plasschaert
 Hans van Baalen (fractievoorzitter)
 Toine Manders

2014-2019 

3 seats:
 Hans van Baalen (fractievoorzitter)
 Jan Huitema
 Cora van Nieuwenhuizen (till 25 October 2017)
 Caroline Nagtegaal-van Doorn (from 14 November 2017)

2019-2024 

4 seats:
 Malik Azmani (top candidate)
 Caroline Nagtegaal-van Doorn
 Makkinga Huitema
 Liesje Schreinemacher
 Bart Groothuis (from 1 February 2020)

References

Main